Sarmastpur, also known as Shrawastipuram, is a village located in Muzaffarpur District, Bihar state, India. The village has a population of around 10,000.

Location
It is near to the Gandak river which flows west to east in the vicinity of the village.  The village is administered by Geyaspur panchayat, Paroo block and is about 45 km east of Muzaffarpur town. The village has many castes - Rajputs, Yadav, Harijans, Paswans, Barbers, etc. but is dominated by Rajput caste.

Education
There is a primary school, high school and intermediate college. Students from other local villages come for education in this village. The literacy rate is quite high compared to other adjacent villages.

Temples
Four temples are situated near the High School. A Sun Temple in the center of the pond makes this village very beautiful.

References

Villages in Muzaffarpur district